Fujikon Industrial Holdings Ltd. is a Hong Kong-based company founded in 1982. It manufactures and sells audio products. These include headphones, microphones, loudspeakers, and handsfree headsets. All these products are sold on an ODM/OEM (Original design manufacturer /Original equipment manufacturer) basis to well-known brands and international customers. The company was listed on the main board of the Hong Kong Stock Exchange in 2000.

References

External links

Audio equipment manufacturers of China
Companies listed on the Hong Kong Stock Exchange
Electronics companies of Hong Kong
Manufacturing companies established in 1982
Headphones manufacturers
Loudspeaker manufacturers
Microphone manufacturers
Hong Kong brands
1982 establishments in Hong Kong